Bill Mannion (28 October 1906 – 26 August 1968) was an  Australian rules footballer who played with South Melbourne in the Victorian Football League (VFL).

Notes

External links 

1906 births
1968 deaths
Australian rules footballers from Victoria (Australia)
Sydney Swans players